Mailand may refer to:

 Mailand, a hamlet on Unst, one of the Shetland Islands
 Mailand Upper Secondary School, a school in Lørenskog, Norway
 the German name for Milan, Italy.